Minuscule 454 (in the Gregory-Aland numbering), Ο 8 (in the Soden numbering), is a Greek minuscule manuscript of the New Testament, on parchment. Palaeographically it has been assigned to the 10th century. 
Formerly it was labeled by 84a and 94p.

Description 

The codex contains the text of the Acts of the Apostles, Catholic epistles, and Pauline epistles on 244 parchment leaves. It lacks Hebrews 13:21-25. The test is written in two columns per page, in 32 lines per page.

Text 

The Greek text of the codex is a representative of the Byzantine text-type. Aland placed it in Category V.

The order of books: Acts, Catholic epistles, and Pauline epistles (Hebrews placed before 1 Timothy).

History 

The manuscript was examined and slightly collated by Birch and Scholz. Antonio Maria Biscioni published its facsimile in 1752. C. R. Gregory saw it in 1886.

The manuscript was added to the list of the New Testament manuscripts by Scholz (1794-1852).

Formerly it was labeled by 84a and 94p. In 1908 Gregory gave the number 454 to it.

It is currently housed at the Laurentian Library (Plutei IV. 1) in Florence.

See also 

 List of New Testament minuscules
 Biblical manuscript
 Textual criticism

References

Further reading 

 Antonio Maria Biscioni, Bibliothecae Mediceo-Laurentianae catalogus, Florence 1752, vol. 2, p. 2-5.

External links 
 

Greek New Testament minuscules
10th-century biblical manuscripts